Anaspidacea is an order of crustaceans, comprising eleven genera in four families. Species in the family Anaspididae vary from being strict stygobionts (only living underground) to species living in lakes, streams and moorland pools, and are found only in Tasmania. Koonungidae is found in Tasmania and the south-eastern part of the Australian mainland, where they live in the burrows made by crayfish and in caves. The families Psammaspididae and Stygocarididae are both restricted to caves, but Stygocarididae has a much wider distribution than the other families, with Parastygocaris having species in New Zealand and South America as well as Australia; two other genera in the family are endemic to South America, and one, Stygocarella, is endemic to New Zealand.

Genera

Anaspididae Thomson, 1893
Allanaspides Swain, Wilson, Hickman & Ong, 1970 – Tasmania
Anaspides Thomson, 1894 – Tasmania
Paranaspides Smith, 1908 – Tasmania
Koonungidae Sayce, 1908
Koonunga Sayce, 1907 – south-eastern Australia and Tasmania
Micraspides Nicholls, 1931 – south-eastern Australia and Tasmania
Psammaspididae Schminke, 1974
Eucrenonaspides Knott & Lake, 1980 – Tasmania
Psammaspides Schminke, 1974 – south-eastern Australia
Stygocarididae Noodt, 1963
Oncostygocaris Schminke, 1980 – southern South America
Parastygocaris Noodt, 1963 – southern South America
Stygocarella Schminke, 1980 – New Zealand
Stygocaris Noodt, 1963 – southern South America, south-eastern Australia and New Zealand

References

Syncarida
Crustacean orders
Freshwater crustaceans